David Katz (1 October 1884, Kassel – 2 February 1953, Stockholm) was a German-born Swedish psychologist and educator who specialized in Gestalt psychology and phenomenology. He was a professor Emeritus at the University of Stockholm. Prior to the establishment of the Nazi regime in Germany, he served as the chair of psychology and education at the State University of Mecklenburg in Rostock.

Academic career 
Katz obtained his doctoral degree from the university of Göttingen in 1906. Katz became the chair of psychology and education at the State University of Mecklenburg in Rostock, Germany in 1919. In 1933, his position was removed when the National Socialist Party took over and he had to leave the country. Katz traveled from Germany to England, where he joined T.H. Pear's laboratory in Manchester, Here, he investigated the role of the tongue as a sensory organ. In 1937, Katz became a professor at the University of Stockholm, where he began to focus on gestalt principles until his retirement in 1952.

Research 
Katz is known for his research in the field of Gestalt psychology and phenomenology, however his interests lay in a variety of fields. In 1918, his work focused on the psychological effects of amputation and the phenomenon of the phantom limb. In England, Katz studied the tongue with T.H Pear and then later began research on the feeding habits of monkeys under poor light conditions with Julian Huxley in 1935. He also investigated subjects like appetite, perceptual constancy, color, kinesthesis, touch, vibratory sense, and musical perception.

Works
 The world of touch, 1925
 Hunger und Appetit, 1932
 The world of colour, 1935
 Conversations with children, 1936
 Animals and men, 1937
 Gestaltpsychologie, 1944
 Psychologischer Atlas, 1945

References

1884 births
1953 deaths
Writers from Kassel
Jewish emigrants from Nazi Germany to Sweden
University of Göttingen alumni
German psychologists
Academic staff of the University of Rostock
Academic staff of Stockholm University
20th-century psychologists